Bangulzai may refer to:

 Bangulzai Hills, Balochistan, Pakistan
 Bangulzai (tribe), an ethnic group of Balochistan, Pakistan